Kabinda may refer to the following places in the Democratic Republic of the Congo:
Kabinda the capital of Lomami Province
Kabinda Territory
Kabinda District
Roman Catholic Diocese of Kabinda

See also
Cabinda (disambiguation)